Hilldyke is a hamlet, lying partly in East Lindsey, and partly in the Borough of Boston, in Lincolnshire, England.

Hilldyke is within an area of arable farmland, and contains a few small businesses. Population figures have reduced over the past 30 years, and now numbers about 12.

Hilldyke's public house, the Pied Bull, closed in the 1960s, although the site of the pub is still named as a local landmark for directions.

External links

 Satellite image from Google

Hamlets in Lincolnshire
Borough of Boston
East Lindsey District